Niobe was a ground-based, cryogenic resonant bar gravitational-wave detector.  The detector used a microwave parametric transducer readout to improve noise performance and detector bandwidth. The detector was run by David Blair at University of Western Australia in Perth. The detector ran in joint science runs from 1993-1998 with the gravitational-wave detectors Auriga, Allegro, Explorer and Nautillus.

See also 
 Gravitational-wave astronomy

References 

Gravitational-wave telescopes
Astronomical observatories in Western Australia